A dynamitard was a person who used explosives for violence against the State, and is a niche metaphor for a revolutionary in politics, culture or social affairs.

Bombers
First appearing in English language newspapers in 1882, the word was understood to be a French expression applied to political terrorists in France. In reality, dynamitard is not a formal French word; French newspapers had conjured it up as a disdainful variant of dynamiteur. It was soon applied to Burton and Cunningham, Irish-Americans who had planted explosives in London. "A term of opprobrium for some and endearment for others, the dynamitard was technically a political dynamiter, of the kind that bombed railway carriages and exploded devices in the House of Commons in the name of Irish freedom, chiefly in the early 1880s."

Metaphorical sense
In nineteenth century politics the term came to be used, particularly by George Bernard Shaw, as metonymy for those who chose violent struggle — as opposed to gradual means — for achieving social revolution: a dynamitard was contrasted with a Fabian. Shaw himself, though a Fabian in politics, was described metaphorically as "a dynamitard among music and drama critics".

In popular culture
Between 1889 and 1903 Stevenston Thistle, who played in the Ayrshire Football League and elsewhere, were known as The Dynamitards. They did not live up to their name, however, losing 7-2 to Clyde F.C. in the first round of the 1894–95 Scottish Cup.

In high culture
Mocked as a neologism by Robert Louis and Fanny van de Grift Stevenson ("Any writard who writes dynamitard shall find in me a never-resting fightard"), its presence in dictionaries regretted by purists, there it has remained.

References

Sources

Books, journals and theses

Newspaper reports and websites

Political terminology
Terrorism tactics
1880s neologisms
Football in Scotland